The 2021 Cork Junior A Football Championship is scheduled to be the 123rd staging of the Cork Junior A Football Championship since its establishment by the Cork County Board in 1895. The championship began on 6 November 2021.

Qualification

Duhallow Junior A Football Championship 
Group 1

Group 2

Knockout Stage

Results

Bracket

Quarter-finals

Semi-finals

Final

Championship statistics

Top scorers

Overall

In a single game

References

External links 

 Cork GAA website

2021 in Irish sport
Cork Junior Football Championship